Cy, CY, or cy may refer to:

People
 Cy (given name)

Fictional characters
 Cy, a Cylon in the final episode ("The Return of Starbuck") of the television series Galactica 1980
 Cy the Cardinal, mascot of Iowa State University
 Cy, mascot of the Pee Dee Cyclones minor league ice hockey team based in Winston-Salem, North Carolina
 Cy, O'Hare Air delivery guy from The Lorax movie

Codes
 Cyprus ISO 3166-1 alpha-2, FIPS Pub 10-4 and obsolete NATO country code
 .cy, Cyprus Internet country code top-level domain (ccTLD)
 Cyprus Airways IATA airline designator
 Cymraeg, otherwise known as the Welsh language ISO 639-1 language code

In science and technology
 Cubic yard
 In BIOS setup, number of cylinders in cylinder-head-sector (CHS) hard disk drive access method
 Cyclohexyl group, in organic chemistry
 Cyclophosphamide, an alkylating agent used in therapy for cancer and some autoimmune diseases
 Samokhodnaya Ustanovka (Russian: самоходная установка), a range of Soviet self-propelled carriages
 Cypress Semiconductor (NASDAQ stock symbol)
 Cy, a code for cyanine dyes

Other uses
 Calendar year
 Common year
 Common Year (Greyhawk)

See also
 C. Y. Leung Chun-ying (born 1954), Chief Executive of the Hong Kong Special Administrative Region
 CCY, IATA code and FAA LID for Northeast Iowa Regional Airport
 Sy (disambiguation)